Coopmans's tyrannulet (Zimmerius minimus) is a species of bird belonging to the family Tyrannidae.
It is found in Colombia and Venezuela. It was formerly considered conspecific with the golden-faced tyrannulet.

References 

Coopmans's tyrannulet
Birds of the Sierra Nevada de Santa Marta
Birds of the Venezuelan Coastal Range
Coopmans's tyrannulet